Cygnus falconeri, the giant swan, is an extinct, very large swan known from Middle Pleistocene-aged deposits from Malta and Sicily. It would have been taller, though not heavier, than the region's dwarf elephants. Due to its size, it may have been flightless. It became extinct before the increase in human activity in the region (see Holocene extinction event), so its disappearance is thought to have resulted from extreme climate fluctuations or the arrival of superior predators and competitors. Its bones are exhibited at Għar Dalam museum in Birżebbuġa, Malta.

References 

†falconeri
Pleistocene birds
Quaternary birds of Europe
Birds described in 1865
Fossil taxa described in 1865